Mackenzie Ruth Scott (born January 23, 1991) is an American indie rock singer-songwriter who performs as Torres.

Early life
Scott was born in Orlando, Florida, United States, and adopted at birth. From the age of three, she was raised in Macon, Georgia.

Brought up in a conservative Christian home, Scott was the youngest of three. At an early age, Scott learned how to play the flute and piano and sang in the children's choir at her Baptist church. Through The Phantom of the Opera, Scott soon became interested in musical theatre. She started singing in her high school's musical production of Fiddler on the Roof. She began to perform in musicals, learned to play guitar, and started playing and singing hymns during church services and at a nursing home every week.

After high school, Scott moved to Nashville, Tennessee, to attend Belmont University, where she received a degree in songwriting and a minor in English literature. In college, Scott began to record her music. She graduated in December 2012.

Career

Torres (2012–2014) 
In July 2012, while she was still a student, Scott recorded her debut album Torres over a five-day session at Tony Joe White's home studio in Franklin, Tennessee, with engineer and producer Ryan McFadden. Following the album's release on February 8, 2013, she played her debut show as Torres in Nashville at The Basement. The album was digitally released on January 22, 2013, and received critical acclaim. In the summer of 2013, she moved to Bushwick, Brooklyn.

Scott has toured extensively in the U.S. and Europe with a wide variety of musicians, including Lady Lamb the Beekeeper, Okkervil River, Sharon Van Etten, and Hamilton Leithauser. Scott appeared as a guest on Sharon Van Etten's 2014 album Are We There and released a single, "New Skin," through Weathervane Music in June 2014.

Sprinter (2015–2016) 
Scott released her second album Sprinter on May 5, 2015, through Partisan Records. Unlike Torres, which was produced in Nashville, Sprinter was recorded in Dorset, England and produced by Rob Ellis. Scott described Sprinter as "something that would feel massive and heavy" with electronic elements, deliberate guitars and languid arrangements.

She toured the U.S. and Europe as a headliner behind this album. She also opened for Garbage and Brandi Carlile, her early musical idol, in 2015, and joined Tegan and Sara for their November 2016 tour.

Three Futures (2017) 
Scott's third album Three Futures was released on September 29, 2017. It was once again produced by Rob Ellis. Production started in Stockport, England, and was completed in the same Dorset studio where she worked on Sprinter. Three Futures takes inspiration from electro-pop, gothic industrial, and Krautrock. Scott also contributed a cover version of "Until I Die" to the Brandi Carlile charity compilation album Cover Stories.

Silver Tongue (2020) 
Scott's fourth studio album Silver Tongue was released on January 31, 2020, via Merge Records. Pitchfork gave it a positive review saying "Tongue is both her most intimate and eclectic album thus far". "Dressing America" was selected as "Song of the Day" by Kevin Cole, the host of The Afternoon Show on KEXP-FM.

Thirstier (2021) 
Scott's fifth album, Thirstier, was released on July 30, 2021.

Influences 
From a young age, Scott has been influenced by Broadway theatre. Her live performances are known to be very dramatic and she believes this stems from her early experiences with musical theater. Scott has cited Brandi Carlile and Fleetwood Mac as major influences on her style. Scott writes poetry and short stories, and she has listed her favorite author as Sylvia Plath, who has inspired many of her works.

Critical reception 
Her self-titled album TORRES received favorable reviews from Beats Per Minute, Pitchfork, and Metacritic. Music website Pitchfork Media named Torres's debut single, "Honey," best new track, describing it as "an arena-rock moment happening on an empty stage [...] with its slow-burn intensity and coiled energy." Following the release of the album, Pitchfork gave the debut Torres album an 8.1 rating calling the record "an overwhelming rush of feeling [...] that connects with throat-seizing immediacy."

TORRES' second album also received many positive reviews. On Metacritic, the album has a score of 81 out of 100, indicating "Universal acclaim." Consequence of Sound praised that Scott's lyrics, "writes with the courage of someone much older. She is already willing to bear the wisdom and insight that comes from her Southern Baptist roots — and from leaving them behind" and gave the album an A−. Pitchfork also praised the album writing "When Scott can find the right balance of these elements—dark, introspective, mid-tempo, highly distorted, and in the four to five-minute range—she hits a sweet spot, like on 'New Skin' and the album's title track."

Torres' third album Three Futures, which was released on September 29, 2017, has been met with positive reviews. Rolling Stone gave the album 3.5 out of 5 stars. The Rolling Stone describes the album as "offering conflicted images of emotional and physical release over bracing industrial-rock textures." The AV Club also praises Three Futures describing it as "hazily fascinating, flowing naturally through its various peaks and valleys, and it succeeds in Scott's goal of being truly immersive listening," while rating the album an A−. Consequence of Sound gave the album a B+, describing Scott's ability to pursue new musical directions "with poise and confidence..." DIY also awarded Three Futures 4 out of 5 stars and noted Scott takes a step forward without forgetting what made her previous albums successful, by venturing into "previously little-trodden ground in sumptuous new ways."

Personal life
Scott is currently in a relationship with artist Jenna Gribbon, who designed the cover for her album Silver Tongue. She describes an experience of meeting her in a dream before they met in person. Scott announced their engagement in October 2020. On May 1, 2021, Scott came out as non-binary in a tweet.

Discography

Studio albums 
 Torres (2013)
 Sprinter (2015)
 Three Futures (2017)
 Silver Tongue (2020)
 Thirstier (2021)

Live albums 
 Live in Berlin (2020)

Other releases 
 "Torres" b/w "Motel Beds" (2014) (Record Store Day)
 "Until I Die"

Music videos
 Skim (2017)
 Three Futures (2017)
 Helen in the Woods (2017)

Singles 
 "Good Scare" (2020)
 "Gracious Day" (2020)

References

External links
 Torres on Partisan Records label
 4ad Records

1991 births
Living people
American singer-songwriters
American rock singers
American rock songwriters
American lesbian musicians
Non-binary singers
Non-binary songwriters
Lesbian singers
Lesbian songwriters
LGBT people from Georgia (U.S. state)
American LGBT singers
American LGBT songwriters
Musicians from Macon, Georgia
American guitarists
21st-century American singers
21st-century American guitarists
Guitarists from Georgia (U.S. state)
Merge Records artists
Partisan Records artists
4AD artists
Singer-songwriters from Georgia (U.S. state)
American non-binary writers